Phiali  is a village in Kapurthala district of Punjab State, India. The village is administrated by a Sarpanch, who is an elected representative.

Demography 
According to the report published by Census India in 2011, Phiali has 118 houses with the total population of 576 persons of which 285 are male and 291 females. Literacy rate of  Phiali is 62.98%, lower than the state average of 75.84%.  The population of children in the age group 0–6 years is 52 which is 9.03% of the total population.  Child sex ratio is approximately 1261, higher than the state average of 846.

Population data

Transport 
Kapurthala Rail Way Station, Rail Coach Fact Rail Way Station are the very nearby railway stations however, Jalandhar City Rail Way station is 23 km away from the village. The village is 73 km away from Sri Guru Ram Dass Jee International Airport in Amritsar and the another nearest airport is Sahnewal Airport  in Ludhiana which is located 77 km away from the village.

References

External links
  Villages in Kapurthala
 Kapurthala Villages List

Villages in Kapurthala district